Scirpodendron is a genus of flowering plants belonging to the family Cyperaceae.

Its native range is Western Pacific.

Species
Species:

Scirpodendron bogneri 
Scirpodendron ghaeri

References

Cyperaceae
Cyperaceae genera